This was the first WTA 125 tournament in Cali since 2013. Catalina Castaño and Mariana Duque were the champions when the event was last held, but they have both since retired from professional tennis.

Weronika Falkowska and Katarzyna Kawa defeated Kyōka Okamura and You Xiaodi in the final, 6–1, 5–7, [10–6] to win the women's doubles tennis title at the 2023 Copa Oster.

Seeds

Draw

Draw

References

Main Draw

2023 WTA 125 tournaments
2023 in Colombian sport
2023